William Carew may refer to:

William Aquin Carew (1922–2012), Canadian bishop, Vatican diplomat 
Sir William Carew, 5th Baronet (1690–1744) of the Carew baronets, MP for Cornwall

See also
William Conolly-Carew, 6th Baron Carew
William Carew Hazlitt
William Pole-Carew
Carew (surname)